The ALCO RS-36 (DL 701) is a  diesel-electric locomotive of which 40 were produced by ALCO between February 1962 and August 1963 for seven railroads.

Original Owners

Surviving units include:

Atlantic & Danville #2, fully restored and owned by the Sothern New England Railroad (now in D&H inspired paint and #5012), Delaware & Hudson #5015, undergoing restoration by the Sothern New England Railroad, Delaware & Hudson #5017, operational and owned by the Delaware & Ulster Railroad, Delaware & Hudson #5019, stored at North Walpole, NH

References

External links
 Sarberenyi, Robert. Alco RS32 and RS36 Original Owners.

B-B locomotives
RS36
Diesel-electric locomotives of the United States
Railway locomotives introduced in 1962
Freight locomotives
Standard gauge locomotives of the United States